Eugen Fischer de Farkasházy (born farkasházi Fischer Jenő) (29 March 1861, Székesfehérvár – 4 May 1926, Herend) was a Hungarian porcelain factory owner, ceramics, art history writing. His brother, Dr. farkasházi Zsigmond Farkasházy (1874–1928), was a former politician, journalist, MP, lawyer.

Life 
A member of the noble Jewish farkasházi Fischer family, was the grandson of Móric Fischer de Farkasházy and Maria Salzer His father, Desider Fischer de Farkasháza (1827?–1914) and his Jewish mother Mary Pressburger it was. He studied at the Ecole des Beaux-Arts in conducted with over eight years of porcelain production has mastered every technique. Having knowledge of the England and Germany was expanded, the Ungvári porcelángyár (Uzhgorod), 1897 – but devoted his excellent knowledge of the Herend Porcelain Manufactory and workforce onwards. He went where his grandfather left off the old China's, Japan's, Meissen's, Vienna and Sèvres i samples based on Herend genre cultivated, and this area has achieved such results in which the traditions of old factories scattered again. The 1900s Paris World Exhibition inspired by modern forms and techniques. Coulon was a great success and pâte-sur-pâte porcelain decoration of users which he designed and painted. Literary work area as well, two major monographs written:  The life and works of Palissy  (1885), The Della Robbia family (1896). He died as CEO of the Herend porcelain factory stock company.

In 1904 his three grandchildren Mór Fischer, Hugo Fischer, and Eugene Fischer lawyer, member of parliament and Farkasházi Lieutenant Alexander Fischer has been granted by Franz Joseph I of Austria from the surname Fischer changed Farkasházy over, with the noble vorname, "farkasházi", retaining

Notes

Sources 

 PIM

More information 

 Sziklay János: Dunántúli kulturmunkások. A Dunántúl művelődéstörténete életrajzokban. Bp., Dunántúli Közművelődési Egyesület, 1941
 Művészeti lexikon. Ed. Éber László. Co-editor Gombosi György. 2nd corr. ed. Bp., 1935. Győző ny. 
 Gulyás Pál: Magyar írók élete és munkái. Bp., Magyar Könyvtárosok és Levéltárosok Egyesülete, 1939–2002
 Művészeti lexikon. Managing ed. Lajta Edit. Bp., Akadémiai Kiadó, 1965–1968
 Kempelen Béla: Magyar nemes családok. Bp., Grill Károly Könyvkiadóvállalata, 1911–1932
 Magyar Nagylexikon. Editor in chief Élesztős László (1–5. k.), Berényi Gábor (6. k.), Bárány Lászlóné (8-). Bp., Akadémiai Kiadó, 1993–
 Magyarországi zsidó és zsidó eredetű családok. Ed. Kempelen Béla. Bp., author's edition, 1937–1939
 Magyar zsidó lexikon. Ed. Ujvári Péter. Bp., Zsidó Lexikon, 1929
 Szinnyei József: Magyar írók élete és munkái. Bp., 1891–1914. Hornyánszky Viktor 
 Veszprém megyei életrajzi lexikon. Editor in chief Varga Béla. Veszprém, Veszprém Megyei Önkormányzatok Közgyűlése, 1998
 Zsidó kultúrtörténeti emlékek Fejér megyében. Székesfehérvár, Szent István Király Múzeum, 2004. május 20. – 23 December. The exhibition was organized and the study by Anna Gergely. Székesfehérvár, 2004
 Berényi Zsuzsanna Ágnes: Budapest és a szabadkőművesség. Bp., author's edition, 2005

References 

1861 births
1926 deaths
Hungarian Jews
Hungarian art historians
Hungarian ceramists
Hungarian nobility
People from Székesfehérvár
Recipients of the Legion of Honour